Radbruch may refer to:

Places 
 Radbruch, a municipality in the district of Lüneburg, in Lower Saxony, Germany

People 
 Gustav Radbruch, a German law professor and politician
 Knut Radbruch, a German mathematician
 Thomas Radbruch, a German photographer

Other 
 Radbruch formula